Australia's First Nations Political Party (AFNPP) was an Australian political party federally registered with the Australian Electoral Commission from 6 January 2011 until 15 August 2015 when it failed to demonstrate evidence of the required 500 party members. The party is also no longer registered at a territory level.

The party was founded by former independent candidate Maurie Japarta Ryan, grandson of Aboriginal Australian activist Vincent Lingiari. The policies of the party focused on issues such as Northern Territory statehood and Aboriginal sovereignty.

The party ran candidates including Warren H Williams in 8 of the 25 unicameral Northern Territory Parliament seats at the 2012 territory election on 2.2 percent of the territory-wide vote. They performed best in the seat of Stuart on 16.4 percent of the vote.

The party ran two Northern Territory Senate candidates including Rosalie Kunoth-Monks at the 2013 federal election on 1.4 percent of the Northern Territory Senate vote.

The party changed their name in November 2013 from "Australian First Nations Political Party" to "Australia's First Nations Political Party".

References

Defunct political parties in the Northern Territory
Defunct political parties in Australia
Political parties established in 2010
2010 establishments in Australia
Political parties disestablished in 2015
Indigenous Australian politics
Indigenist political parties in Oceania
Political parties of minorities